Eagle score is a five-point scoring system, used mainly for vascular patients, and allows for an accurate estimate of a patient's risk of dying during heart surgery.

Main risk factors
 Age > 70
 Angina
 Myocardial infarction (history or Q waves)
 Congestive cardiac failure
 Diabetes

Estimated mortality
0 factor: 3%
1-2 factors: 8%
3 factors: 18%

References

Medical scoring system